Dianthus serotinus, called the late pink, late-coming pink, late carnation or late-coming carnation due to its tendency to bloom from June to October, is a species of Dianthus native to the Pannonian Basin of Hungary and nearby areas. It prefers to grow in the sand-steppe or other sandy soils.

References

serotinus
Plants described in 1804